Summer in the Winter is a commercial mixtape
by American rapper Kid Ink. It was released commercially on December 25, 2015, by RCA Records. This project was produced by DJ Mustard, who is serving as an executive producer, alongside the additional production by Twice as Nice and The Featherstones, among others.

Commercial performance 
Summer in the Winter debuted at number 50 on the US Billboard 200, with 16,000 equivalent album units (selling 11,000 in pure sales).

Singles
"Promise" served as the lead single from the project. It was released on December 24, 2015 along the promotional single "Blowin' Swishers Pt.2".

Track listing 
Credits were adapted from Tidal.

Notes
 "Promise" feature background vocals from Lewis Hughes
 "Bank" feature background vocals from Marlin Bonds
 "Summer in the Winter", "That's on You" and "Time Out" feature background vocals from Khaled Rohaim

Charts

Release history

References

2015 mixtape albums
Kid Ink albums
RCA Records albums